This is an alphabetical list of articles pertaining specifically to civil engineering. For a broad overview of engineering, please see List of engineering topics. For biographies please see List of civil engineers.

A
Accuracy and precision –
American Society of Civil Engineers –
Applied mechanics –
Arch

B
Beam (structure) –
Bending –
Brittle –
Buckling

C
Carbon fiber –
Check dam –
Classical mechanics –
Composite material –
Compressive strength –
Computational fluid dynamics –
Computer-aided design –
Conservation of mass –
Concrete –
Corrosion

D
Dam –
Damping ratio –
Deformation –
Delamination –
Design –
Dimensionless number –
Drafting –
Dynamics

E
Elasticity –
Engineering drawing –
Exploratory engineering

F
Factor of safety –
Fatigue –
Fillet –
Finite element analysis –
Finite element method –
Fluid mechanics –
Force –
Friction –
Fundamentals of Engineering exam

G
Gauge –
Gauge (engineering) –
Granular material

H
Heating and cooling systems –
Hydraulics –
Hydrostatics

I
Inclined plane –
Inertia –
Instrumentation –
Invention

J
Joint

L
Lever –
Liability –
Life cycle cost analysis –
Limit state design –
Load transfer

M
Margin of safety –
Mass transfer –
Materials –
Materials engineering –
Material selection –
Mechanics –
Moment –
Moment of inertia

N
Normal stress –
Nozzle

P
Physics –
Plasticity –
Plastic moment –
Poisson's ratio –
Position vector –
Pressure –
Product lifecycle management –
Professional engineer –
Project management –
Pulley –
Pump –
Pile foundation

Q
Quality –
Quality control –
Quantity surveying

R
Reliability engineering –
Resistive force –
Reverse engineering –
Rigid body –
Reinforced concrete –

S
Safety engineering –
Shear force diagrams –
Shear modulus –
Shear strength –
Shear stress –
Simple machine –
Simulation –
Slide rule –
Solid mechanics –
Solid modeling –
Spoolbase –
Statics –
Stress–strain curve –
Structural failure –
Student design competition –
Surveying –

T
Technical drawing –
Technology –
Tensile strength –
Tensile stress –
Theodolite –
Theory of elasticity –
Toughness –
Turbine –

V
Vector –
Viscosity –
Vibration

W
Wedge –
Weight transfer –
Weir

Y
Yield strength –
Young's modulus

Civil engineering
Civil engineering topics